Hentziectypus florendidus is a species of comb-footed spider in the family Theridiidae. It is found from the USA to Venezuela.

References

Theridiidae
Spiders described in 1959
Spiders of North America
Spiders of South America